Jiji is a railway station on the Taiwan Railways Administration Jiji line located in Jiji Township, Nantou County, Taiwan.

History
The station was opened for operation on 14 January 1922 during Japanese rule which was mostly used for transporting materials to the nearby power plant. The station relocated to its current location on 2 February 1930. The station was severely damaged in the 1999 Jiji earthquake (921 earthquake) on 21 September 1999 and was reconstructed in 2001. Contactless smart card fare gates were installed at this station on 30 June 2015.

Around the station
 Jiji Military History Park
 Jiji Weir
 Mingxin Academy

See also
 List of railway stations in Taiwan

References

1922 establishments in Taiwan
Railway stations in Nantou County
Railway stations opened in 1922
Railway stations served by Taiwan Railways Administration